Sitovo is a village in northeastern Bulgaria, part of Silistra Province. It is the administrative centre of Sitovo Municipality, which lies in the central part of Silistra Province, 25 kilometres west of the provincial capital of Silistra, in the historical region of Southern Dobruja.

Municipality

Sitovo municipality covers an area of 271 square kilometres and includes the following 12 places:

External links
 Sitovo Municipality official page under construction at national government website 

Villages in Silistra Province